The name Rina has been used for two tropical cyclones in the Atlantic Ocean.

 Hurricane Rina (2011), a powerful but small Category 3 hurricane that made landfall in the Yucatan Peninsula. 
 Tropical Storm Rina (2017), a strong tropical storm which formed in the Central Atlantic. 

Atlantic hurricane set index articles